Achilleas Neokaisareias F.C. is a Greek football club, based in Neokaisareia, Pieria.

The club was founded in 1968. They will play for 3rd season in Football League 2 for the season 2018-19.

Football clubs in Central Macedonia
Association football clubs established in 1968
1968 establishments in Greece
Gamma Ethniki clubs